Phostria indignalis is a moth in the family Crambidae. It was described by William Schaus in 1920. It is found in Guatemala.

The wingspan is about 32 mm. The wings are dark brown.

References

Phostria
Moths described in 1920
Moths of Central America